Village is an unincorporated community in Northumberland and Richmond counties, Virginia, United States. Village is located on U.S. Route 360 east of Warsaw.

The origin of the name "Village" is obscure.

References

Unincorporated communities in Northumberland County, Virginia
Unincorporated communities in Richmond County, Virginia
Unincorporated communities in Virginia